Caladenia sericea, commonly known as the silky blue orchid, is a plant in the orchid family Orchidaceae and is endemic to the south-west of Western Australia. It is a common orchid in the high rainfall areas of the state and has a single, broad, silky leaf and up to four blue-mauve flowers.

Description
The lateral sepals and petals have about the same dimensions as the dorsal sepal. The sides of the labellum curve upwards to surround the column, and the short tip curls downward with short teeth on its sides. There are four or six rows of purple calli along the mid-line of the labellum. Flowering occurs from August to early October and is much more prolific after summer fires.

Taxonomy and naming
Caladenia sericea was first formally described in 1840 by John Lindley and the description was published in A Sketch of the Vegetation of the Swan River Colony.  In 2000, Stephen Hopper and Andrew Brown changed the name to Cyanicula sericea, but in 2015, as a result of studies of molecular phylogenetics Mark Clements changed the name back to Caladenia sericea. The specific epithet (sericea) is a Latin word meaning "silken" or "silky" referring to the silky leaf.

Distribution and habitat
Silky blue orchid occurs in the higher rainfall areas of Western Australia between Jurien Bay in the north and Esperance in the east, in the Avon Wheatbelt, Esperance Plains, Jarrah Forest, Swan Coastal Plain and Warren biogeographic regions, growing in forest, woodland and on granite outcrops.

Conservation
Caladenia sericea is classified as "not threatened" by the Western Australian Government Department of Parks and Wildlife.

References

sericea
Endemic orchids of Australia
Orchids of Western Australia
Plants described in 1840
Endemic flora of Western Australia